The South Wales Intermediate Cup is the regional knock-out competition for clubs beneath the umbrella of the South Wales Football Association, at the level of Tier 4 and below of the Welsh Football Pyramid in South Wales.

History
The cup was originally called the South Wales & Monmouthshire Amateur Cup, run by the South Wales and Monmouthshire Football Association until after the 1967–68 season.

Previous winners
Information sourced from the South Wales Football Association website.

1890s

 1891–92: – Treharris
 1891–93: – Cardiff
 1893–94: – Rogerstone
 1894–95: – Builth Rangers
 1895–96: – Treharris Rangers
 1896–97: – Porth
 1897–98: – Llandrindod Wells
 1898–99: – Milford Haven
 1899–1900: – Rogerstone

1900s

 1900–01: – Gadlys Rovers
 1901–02: – Treharris
 1902–03: – Cardiff Albions
 1903–04: – Milford Haven
 1904–05: – Pontlottyn
 1905–06: – Barry Dock Albion
 1906–07: – 2nd Wiltshire Regiment
 1907–08: – Llanfaes Brigade
 1908–09: – Troedyrhiw Stars
 1909–10: – High Cross Stars Rogerstone

1910s

 1910–11: – Mond Nickel Works 
 1911–12: – Aberaman Athletic & Nelson
 1912–13: – Aberaman Athletic
 1913–14: – Barry ‘A’
 1914–15: – No competition - World War One
 1915–16: – No competition - World War One
 1916–17: – No competition - World War One
 1917–18: – No competition - World War One
 1918–19: – No competition - World War One
 1919–20: – Troedyrhiw Stars

1920s

 1920–21: – Treharris Athletic
 1921–22: – Abercynon
 1922–23: – Cardiff Corinthians reserves
 1923–24: – Merthyr Vale
 1924–25: – Wattstown
 1925–26: – Wattstown
 1926–27: – Dowlais Town
 1927–28: – Merthyr Vale Rechabites
 1928–29: – Swansea ‘A’
 1929–30: – Ranks Athletic

1930s

 1930–31: – Treorchy Juniors
 1931–32: – Treharris Athletic
 1932–33: – Treorchy Juniors
 1933–34: – Treharris Athletic
 1934–35: – Caerphilly United
 1935–36: – Caerphilly United
 1936–37: – Llwynypia Colliery
 1937–38: – Swansea Nomads
 1938–39: – Llwynypia Colliery
 1939–40: – No competition

1940s

 1940–41: – No competition
 1941–42: – No competition
 1942–43: – No competition
 1943–44: – 32 MU RAF
 1944–45: – Abercynon Athletic
 1945–46: – Bargoed United
 1946–47: – Cwmbach Royal Stars
 1947–48: – Hirwaun Welfare
 1948–49: – Brynna United
 1949–50: – Grange Albion

1950s

 1950–51: – Fleur-de Lys Welfare
 1951–52: – Cilfynydd Welfare
 1952–53: – GKB & N (Cardiff)
 1953–54: – Hirwaun Welfare
 1954–55: – Penarth Town
 1955–56: – Guest Keen (Cardiff)
 1956–57: – Steel Company of Wales
 1957–58: – Taffs Well
 1958–59: – Cwmbach Sports
 1959–60: – Guest Keen (Cardiff)

1960s

 1960–61: – Cwm Welfare
 1961–62: – Guest Keen (Cardiff)
 1962–63: – Tynte Rovers
 1963–64: – Cardiff Cosmos
 1964–65: – Cardiff Cosmos
 1965–66: – St Patricks
 1966–67: – Swansea Nomads
 1967–68: – Guest Keen (Cardiff)
 1968–69: – Swansea Nomads
 1969–70: – Cambrian United

1970s

 1970–71: – Ynyscynon Athletic
 1971–72: – Cambrian United
 1972–73: – Abercwmboi Athletic
 1973–74: – Llanishen
 1974–75: – Taffs Well
 1975–76: – Barry Plastics
 1976–77: – Taffs Well
 1977–78: – Cardiff Cosmos
 1978–79: – Ely Rangers
 1979–80: – Anthonys

1980s

 1980–81: – Ely Rangers
 1981–82: – Llantwit Fardre
 1982–83: – Seaview
 1983–84: – Bridgend Street
 1984–85: – Caerau (Ely)
 1985–86: – Llantwit Fardre
 1986–87: – Baglan BC
 1987–88: – Grange Albion
 1988–89: – Hoover Sports
 1989–90: – Porthcawl Town

1990s

 1990–91: – Llwydcoed Welfare 
 1991–92: – Bridgend Street
 1992–93: – Les Croupiers Caerau (Ely)
 1993–94: – Les Croupiers Caerau (Ely)
 1994–95: – Les Croupiers Caerau (Ely)
 1995–96: – Gwynfi United
 1996–97: – Les Croupiers Caerau (Ely)
 1997–98: – Troedyrhiw
 1998–99: – AFC Llwydcoed
 1999–2000: – Bettws

2000s

 2000–01: – Grange Albion 
 2001–02: – Llantwit Fardre
 2002–03: – Caerau All Whites
 2003–04: – Pantyscallog Village Juniors
 2004–05: – Cornelly United
 2005–06: – Glyncorrwg Hall
 2006–07: – Glyncorrwg Hall
 2007–08: – Abernant Rovers
 2008–09: – Penrhiwceiber Con A
 2009–10: – Clwb Cymric

2010s

 2010–11: – Brackla
 2011–12: – Trelai 
 2012–13: – Margam YC
 2013–14: – Bluebird 
 2014–15: – Gelli Hibernia 
 2015–16: – Trebanog
 2016–17: – Penydarren
 2017–18: – No competition
 2018–19: – Holton Road
 2019–20: – Competition cancelled - Covid-19 pandemic

2020s

 2020–21: – No competition - Covid-19 pandemic
 2021–22: – Llanrumney Athletic

Multiple winners - number of competition wins

Caerau (Ely) – 5
Guest Keen (Cardiff)/ GKB & N (Cardiff) – 5
Cardiff Cosmos – 3
Grange Albion – 3
Swansea Nomads – 3
Bridgend Street – 2
Caerphilly United – 2
Cambrian United – 2
Ely Rangers – 2
Glyncorrwg Hall – 2
Hirwaun Welfare – 2
Llantwit Fardre – 2
Llwynypia Colliery – 2
Milford Haven – 2
Rogerstone – 2
Taffs Well – 2
Treorchy Juniors – 2
Troedyrhiw Stars – 2
Wattstown – 2

References

Football cup competitions in Wales
1891 establishments in Wales
Football in Wales
County Cup competitions
Recurring events established in 1891